Ancita australica is a species of beetle in the family Cerambycidae. It was described by Stephan von Breuning in 1982. It is known from Australia.

References

Ancita
Beetles described in 1982
Taxa named by Stephan von Breuning (entomologist)